Newton Township is one of the twenty-four townships of Trumbull County, Ohio, United States.  The 2000 census found 9,524 people in the township, 4,522 of whom lived in the unincorporated portions of the township.

Geography
Located in the southwestern corner of the county, it borders the following townships and village:
Braceville Township - north
Warren Township - northeast corner
Lordstown - east
Jackson Township, Mahoning County - southeast corner
Milton Township, Mahoning County - south
Palmyra Township, Portage County - southwest corner
Paris Township, Portage County - west
Windham Township, Portage County - northwest corner

Most of the city of Newton Falls is located in northwestern Newton Township, and the census-designated place of South Canal lies in the township's west.

Newton Township covers an area of 25 sq mi.

Name and history
Newton Township was likely named for Newtown, Connecticut soon after its creation in 1806.  It is one of five Newton Townships statewide.

Newton Township was formed from the Connecticut Western Reserve.

Government
The township is governed by a three-member board of trustees, who are elected in November of odd-numbered years to a four-year term beginning on the following January 1. Two are elected in the year after the presidential election and one is elected in the year before it. There is also an elected township fiscal officer, who serves a four-year term beginning on April 1 of the year after the election, which is held in November of the year before the presidential election. Vacancies in the fiscal officership or on the board of trustees are filled by the remaining trustees.

References

External links
County website

Townships in Trumbull County, Ohio
Townships in Ohio
Populated places established in 1806
1806 establishments in Ohio